Mackenzie McDonald and Tommy Paul were the defending champions but chose not to defend their title.

Max Purcell and Luke Saville won the title after defeating Ariel Behar and Enrique López Pérez 6–4, 7–5 in the final.

Seeds

Draw

References
 Main draw

City of Playford Tennis International - Men's Doubles